Kali is an Indian given name and surname of Sanskrit origins from the name Kālá. It is also a Finnish masculine given name that is a form of Kalle. Notable people with this name include the following:

Mononym
Kali. Hindu goddess, destroyer of evil forces
Kali (Bulgarian singer), professional name of Galina Dimitrova Ivanova (born 1975), Bulgarian singer
Kali (demon), Hindu mortal demon, source of all evil
Kali (footballer), nickname of Carlos Manuel Gonçalves Alonso, (born 1978), Angolan former footballer
Kali (painter), nickname of Hanna Weynerowska (1918–1998), Polish painter
Kali (French singer), stage name of Jean-Marc Monnerville (born 1959), French musician

‘ 
Kali Meehan, nickname of Kalivati Gerald Meehan (born 1970), New Zealand-born boxer
Kali Mirza, stagename of Kalidas Chattopadhyay, Indian composer
Kali Mountford, nickname of Carol Jean Mountford (born 1954), British politician
Kali Muscle, stagename of Chuck Kirkendall (born 1975), American bodybuilder, model and actor
Kali Mutsa, stagename of Celine Reymond, Chilean singer and the name of her band
Kali N. Rathnam, stage name of Narayana Padaiyatchi Rathnam, (c. 1897 – 1950), Indian actor
Kali Uchis, professional name of Karly-Marina Loaiza (born 1994), American singer and songwriter

Given name

Kali Alaudeen (born 1984), Indian football player
Kali Arulpragasam, English jewelry designer and artist (also sister of musician M.I.A.)
Kali Charan Bahl, Indian professor of languages and linguistics
Kali Banerjee (1921–1993), Indian film actor
Kali Charan Banerjee (1847–1902), Indian Christian
Kali S. Banerjee (1914–2002), Bangladeshi statistics professor
Kali Prasad Baskota (born 1979) Nepali singer, musician and lyricist
Kali Christ (born 1991), Canadian speed skater
Kali Davis-White (born 1994), American sprint athlete
Kali Ranjan Deb, Indian politician
Kali Flanagan (born 1995), American ice hockey player
Kali Gwegwe (born 1969), Nigerian football executive
Kali Hawk (born 1986), American actress, comedian and model
Kali Charan Hembram (born 1960), Indian writer
Kali Bahadur Malla, Nepalese politician
Kali Nikitas (born 1964), American graphic designer
Kali Ongala (born 1979), English football player
Kali Prasad (born 1967), Indian politician
Kali Reis (born 1986), American boxer
Kali Rocha (born 1971), American actress
Kali Nath Roy (1878–1945), Indian journalist and editor
Kali Charan Saraf, Indian politician
Kali Spitzer (born 1987), Canadian indigenous photographer
Kali Charan Suman (born 1964), Indian politician
Kali Troy (born 1971), American voice actress
Kali VanBaale (born 1975), American novelist

Middle name
Rognvald Kali Kolsson (c. 1103 – 1158), Norwegian saint
Shar-Kali-Sharri (fl. c. 2217–2193 BC), Akkadian Empire king

Surname
Anouar Kali (born 1991), Moroccan football player
Cyril Kali (born 1984), French footballer 
Kelley Kali, American director and producer
Maitreya Kali and Satya Sai Maitreya Kali, stagename of Craig Vincent Smith (1945–2012), American musician, songwriter and actor
Sándor Káli (born 1951), Hungarian politician
Shanti Kali (died 2000), Indian Hindu priest
Sinbad Kali (born 1987), Australian rugby footballer
Tamar-kali, American singer-songwriter
Wavala Kali (born 1954), Papua New Guinean sprint athlete

See also

Kai (name)
Kail (surname)
Kaji (surname)
Kala (name)
Kale (name)
Kalin (surname)
Kalis (surname)
Kalk (surname)
Kalli (name)
Kari (name)
Karli (name)
Kazi (given name)
Koli (surname)

Notes